Eolas is a United States research and development company and patent licensee.

Eolas may also refer to:

 Eòlas Media, a TV production company; see Virtual Hebrides
 , French lawyer